Khurian or Khvorian may refer to:
 Khurian, Shahrud